Knightmare was a custom roller coaster at the now defunct Camelot Theme Park in Chorley, Lancashire, United Kingdom. It was built by Zierer and designed by Anton Schwarzkopf.

History

It was originally built in 1987 for a theme park in Kobe, Japan called Portopialand (now defunct) under the name BMRX'/'Bavarian Mountain Railroad, and was a dark indoor ride with a huge mountain themed structure surrounding it. After Portopialand closed in March 2006, the roller coaster was acquired by Camelot theme park and was dismantled and shipped to the United Kingdom. It cost the park £3 million to build the roller coaster. 

The track and trains arrived at Camelot at the end of 2006, without the mountain structure that initially enclosed it. At the beginning of 2007, the reconstruction began, with the ride finally opening to the public in the summer of 2007, as Knightmare. The coaster originally featured five different coloured trains. When relaunched at Camelot, the park refurbished three of the five trains. 

Some of the steam train theming was removed (such as the funnel and headlights) from the front of the trains. The three trains were painted differently with one being partly maroon, one partly purple and the other partly green. The other two trains were placed in storage at the park.

The ride takes the train up a semi spiral chain lift to its tallest point at 87 feet, then drops the train into an overbanked turn. The ride then takes passengers through various sharp turns, multiple helixes and a near-vertical bend (nicknamed "the psycho drop") halfway through where they experience almost 5G, reaching speeds of about 40 mph.

The ride was over a half mile long, and lasted just under two minutes. Knightmare was arguably one of the most intense rollercoasters in the United Kingdom, and at the time of opening had the highest g-force of any roller coaster in the United Kingdom. 

It was located in the Land of the Brave area of the park, situated on the former sites of Camelot's long defunct flagship roller coasters (The Tower of Terror and The Gauntlet); it was also next to the site of the ride Excalibur 2. Knightmare is one of only three of its kind in the world, Jetline at Gröna Lund (clone) and Lisebergbanan at Liseberg (custom layout). 

After having trouble with low visitor numbers, The Story Group and Knights Leisure Limited announced that they were permanently closing Camelot Theme Park in November 2012, after twenty nine years. The rollercoaster remained SBNO (standing but not operating) within the abandoned park since 2012 until 2020. 

In recent years, there were incidents regarding safety concerns of urban explorers climbing 80 ft to the top of the rollercoaster's lift hill, gaining much national media attention.

In February 2020, it was seen that Knightmare had begun being dismantled. It was hoped that the ride was being removed to be refurbished and relocated, however on closer inspection, it is clear that the coaster was being torn to the ground by demolition company, ‘Squibb’.

Up until that point, it was hoped that the coaster could be rescued and refurbished by another park, however due to the effects of being left SBNO for nearly eight years, the coaster was likely beyond repair, and would be far too expensive to get it operating again.

Rumours 
In March 2015, internet rumours circulated throughout many rollercoaster forums that Southport Pleasureland were targeting the Knightmare rollercoaster as a new addition to the park, though Pleasureland owner Norman Wallis was very vague in addressing these rumours.

In May 2017, the Blackpool Gazette reported the first public sighting of a Knightmare rollercoaster train since Camelot's closure, in which the train slipped off the back of a lorry transporting it and fell onto the middle of a road in Thornton, there were no injuries in the incident. The condition of the train itself is still unknown.

In August 2017, Southport Pleasureland denied all rumours of their involvement with Knightmare, despite photographic evidence of the Knightmare trains being seen in park storage, stating in their response to a theme park news website in the United Kingdom, Ride Rater, that "we don't have it".

References

Roller coasters in the United Kingdom
Roller coasters manufactured by Anton Schwarzkopf
2007 establishments in England
2012 disestablishments in England